,  is a Japan Air Self-Defense Force (JASDF) and United States Air Force (USAF) base in  the Tama Area, or Western Tokyo.

It occupies portions of Akishima, Fussa, Hamura, Mizuho, Musashimurayama, and Tachikawa.

The base houses 14,000 personnel.

It features the JASDF Air Defense Command Headquarters (ADC headquarters) since 26 March 2012. The headquarters of United States Forces Japan is also located there. Other base facilities are the broadcast center for the American Forces Network Tokyo radio service and a detachment of Pacific Air Forces' Band of the Pacific.

History

Tama Airfield
The facility which houses Yokota Air Base was originally constructed by the Imperial Japanese Army (IJA) in 1940 as Tama Airfield, and used as a flight test center. During World War II Yokota became the center of Japanese Army Air Forces flight test activities and the base was the site of the first meeting between Japanese and Italian wartime allies.

Tama was first identified by United States Army Air Forces (USAAF) in November 1944 by a 3d Reconnaissance Squadron F-13 Superfortress photo-reconnaissance aircraft, flying from Tinian in the Mariana Islands. It was identified as being associated with the aircraft manufacturing plant belonging to Nakajima Aircraft Company in the nearby town (now city) of Musashino. Along with Tachikawa Air Base to the east and the factory of Showa Aircraft Industry to the south, it was compared to the aircraft development complex of the USAAF Wright-Patterson Field in Ohio. According to the USAAF intelligence at the time, the two bases conducted all IJA flight testing. In the spring of 1945, XXI Bomber Command attacked the base eight times along with the aircraft manufacturing plant, but each time heavy clouds forced the bombers to attack secondary targets. The Nakajima plant was finally attacked in April 1945, but the Tama airfield never was bombed.

Postwar years
With the Surrender of Japan on 2 September 1945, a detachment of the United States Army 1st Cavalry Division arrived at the base on 4 September. The airfield's buildings were largely intact, and some 280 of the IJA's most modern aircraft were discovered in hangars.

The 1st Cavalry named the facility Fussa Army Airfield, then at the end of September renamed it Yokota Army Airfield after a nearby village (now incorporated in Musashimurayama) the name of which appeared on a 1944 US map.

The name was to have been changed to Wilkins Army Air Base (WAAB) after Medal of Honor recipient Raymond "Ray" Wilkins, but orders for this never arrived and it remained under the name Yokota Army Airfield until the USAAF became the USAF in 1947, at which point it became Yokota Air Base. Some metal manhole covers stamped "WAAB" remain in use around the base as of 2017.

The initial USAAF use for the base was for airlift operations when the 2d Combat Cargo Group arrived with four C-47 Skytrain squadrons. When the old runway deteriorated under heavy usage, the runway was repaired and Yokota supported operations of the A-26 Invader-equipped 3d Bombardment Group by August 1946. Additional construction during the 1940s and 1950s was completed and the base reached its current size around 1960.

On the occasion of extension, the course of Hachiko Line and National Route 16 was changed, and Itsukaichi Kaidō was divided.

During the initial postwar occupation years, Yokota hosted the following known USAAF/USAF units:

20th Combat Mapping Group (October 1945 – April 1946) (F-7 Liberator)
8th Reconnaissance Group (June 1946 – October 1947) (F-7)
71st Reconnaissance Group (February 1947 – April 1949) (RB-17, RB-29, RF-51, RF-61 and RF-80)

These units performed photographic reconnaissance and mapping of Japan and South Korea.

6th Night Fighter Squadron (1946–47) (P-61A/B)Inactivated and personnel, mission and equipment transferred to 339th Fighter Squadron (347th Fighter Group) with F-82F/G Twin Mustangs at Nagoya Air Base.
82nd Photo Reconnaissance Squadron (1947–48) (FP-80)
3d Emergency Rescue Squadron (July 1947 – April 1950) (SB-17G)Flew modified B-17G bombers equipped with a 27-foot boat (termed the A-1) under their bellies that could be dropped by parachute and contained enough food, water, and clothing for twelve survivors to last for about twenty days in the ocean.

Korean War
During the Korean War, Yokota was used for combat missions over North and South Korea. Known units based there were:

Fighter units
27th Fighter-Escort Wing (November – December 1950)Flew F-84E Thunderjets on armed reconnaissance, interdiction, fighter escort, and close air support missions.
35th Fighter-Interceptor Wing (April - August 1950)Flew F-80Cs on air defense missions.
339th Fighter Squadron (April – August 1950)Attached to 35th Fighter-Interceptor Wing and flew F-82F/G Twin Mustang missions over South Korea during the first few months of hostilities.
Bombardment units
92d Bombardment Group (325th, 326th and 327th Bombardment Squadrons) (July – October 1950)Deployed squadrons from Spokane Army Airfield, Washington. Flew B-29 Bombing missions over North Korea.
98th Bombardment Wing (343d, 344th and 345th Bomb Squadrons) (August 1950 – July 1954)Group, then Wing deployed from Spokane Army Airfield. Flew B-29 Bombing missions over North Korea. Two days after arriving at Yokota, the squadrons conducted a bomb mission against marshalling yards at Pyongyang, North Korea. The 98th BG engaged primarily in interdiction of enemy communications centers but also supported UN ground forces. Interdiction targets included marshalling yards, oil centers, rail facilities, bridges, roads, troop concentrations, airfields, and military installations.
Reconnaissance units
31st Strategic Reconnaissance Squadron Photographic (July–August 1950)Flew combat missions to provide FEAF (Far East Air Forces) Bomber Command with target and bomb-damage assessment photography.
91st Strategic Reconnaissance Squadron, Medium, Photographic (December 1950 – December 1954)Assigned to 407th Strategic Fighter Wing (1953–54)Absorbed the personnel and resources of the 31st Strategic Reconnaissance Squadron in Japan. Using RB-29, RB-45, RB-50 and RB-36 aircraft, it performed target and bomb-damage assessment photo and visual reconnaissance for FEAF Bomber Command, flew other special photographic missions, and conducted electronic "ferret" reconnaissance to determine frequency, location, and other characteristics of enemy ground radar. The squadron also performed shipping surveillance over the Sea of Japan near the Siberian coast and leaflet drops over North Korea. Beginning in late 1952, rotating aircrews of the Philippine-based 581st Air Resupply and Communications Wing augmented the 91st SRS in flying leaflet missions.
512th Bombardment Squadron (January – August 1950)Operated the B/RB/WB-29 aircraft and flew weather reconnaissance missions.
56th Weather Reconnaissance Squadron (September 1951 – July 1972)Replaced the 512th Bomb Squadron in their weather reconnaissance mission. They operated WB-29, WB-50, WC-135B and RB-57 aircraft used to sample airborne nuclear debris as well as weather patterns in the Pacific.

Cold War
With the Korean War reaching an armistice in July 1953, Yokota Air Base returned to a peacetime Cold War status. Two major wings were stationed at the base during the 1950s, the 67th Reconnaissance Wing (1956–60) flying RF-80s, RF-84s and lastly RF-101s. The 35th Fighter-Interceptor Wing (1954–57) flew F-86 Sabres from the base. A Tactical Air Command (TAC) air refueling unit, the 421st Air Refueling Squadron flew KB-29s, and later KB-50Js from Yokota from 1953 to 1965. All of these units were under the command of the 41st Air Division.

The 35th TFW was reassigned in 1957 and the 67th TRW in 1960. Defense budget restrictions in the late 1950s caused several PACAF wings based in Japan to be reassigned or inactivated. These tactical fighter units were replaced by the B-57 equipped 3rd Bombardment Wing where it trained in bombardment, reconnaissance and aerial refueling operations. The Air Defense Command 40th Fighter-Interceptor Squadron (December 1961 – May 1962) equipped with the F-102 Delta Dagger performing an air defense mission.

The 6102d Air Base Wing assumed host unit status for the base, being replaced by the 441st Combat Support Group in 1964.

The Vietnam War resulted in an increased combat and airlift aircraft presence at the base. Yokota was used for ferrying B-52 Stratofortresses to Southeast Asia along with being a base for US-based deployed F-105 Thunderchief 35th, 36th and 80th Tactical Fighter Squadrons. The 610th Military Airlift Support Squadron (1966–78) was created by Military Airlift Command (MAC) to service the large increase in transiting airlift. The 65th Military Airlift Support Group (1969–71) was a headquarters organization for MAC airlift support squadrons in the Pacific and Far East.

The F-105 squadrons deployed frequently to USAF-operated bases in Thailand to fly combat missions over North and South Vietnam, and to South Korea for alert missions. Initially the fighter squadrons were under the command of the 41st Air Division, but was reassigned shortly after to the 6441st Tactical Fighter Wing, activated in April 1965 to control the F-105 squadrons after their parent organization, the 8th Tactical Fighter Wing, relocated to George Air Force Base, California to become an F-4 Phantom II unit. With the reassignment of the 347th Fighter Wing to Yokota in 1968, the 347th assumed responsibility for all tactical fighters until its reassignment to Kunsan Air Base, South Korea in March 1971.

In 1971, all combat squadrons were transferred to Kadena and Misawa Air Base and Yokota became a non-flying station hosted by the 475th Air Base Wing. The 475th had no numbered flying squadrons, but operated a few T-39 Saberliners and UH-1 helicopters, along with supporting transient MAC cargo and passenger aircraft. Assigned flying squadrons returned to Yokota in 1975 when the 345th Tactical Airlift Squadron was assigned with its C-130Es.

Headquarters, Fifth Air Force was transferred to Yokota on 11 November 1974 from Fuchū Air Base, Japan.

Post-Cold War
In 2005, the Japanese government announced that the headquarters of the Japan Air Self-Defense Force Air Defense Command would be moved to Yokota.

The Tokyo Metropolitan Government has advocated opening Yokota to civilian flights as a method of relieving traffic at Haneda and Narita Airport. Governor Shintaro Ishihara raised the joint-use proposal during the 2003 gubernatorial election, and Governor Naoki Inose made comments in 2013 that suggested joint use as a possible solution to cope with visitor demand during the 2020 Summer Olympics in Tokyo.

In November 2009, the base was attacked by Kakurōkyō members using improvised mortar barrages.

In April 2010 Colonel Frank Eppich, the USAF commander of base, banned screenings of the film The Cove at the base theater. A base spokesman said that The Cove was banned because using a base venue to display the film could be seen as an endorsement of the film. The spokesman added, "We have a lot of issues with Japan... and anything done on an American base would be seen as an approval of that event."

Personnel and aircraft from the base assisted with Operation Tomodachi following and during the March 2011 Tōhoku earthquake and tsunami and Fukushima I nuclear accidents. The base also served as an important hub for airlifted assistance during the disaster recovery efforts. During the crisis, around 600 American family members voluntarily departed the base for locations outside Japan.

On 21 March 2012 JASDF units completed moving from Fuchū Air Base (Tokyo). On 26 March, JASDF Yokota Air Base started operations.

In 2013, the air base was again attacked by Kakurokyo members by improvised mortar barrages.

On 5 April 2018 five CV-22 Osprey tiltrotor aircraft deployed to the base. They had originally been scheduled to deploy to Yokota in 2020, but the deployment was brought forward. As the first permanent deployment of the aircraft outside of Okinawa, the move sparked local protests. The number of aircraft will eventually reach 10.

Major commands to which assigned 
1st Cavalry Division, United States Army Forces Pacific, (September 1945)
Pacific Air Command, US Army, (September 1945 – January 1947)
Far East Air Forces (January 1947 – July 1957)
Pacific Air Forces (July 1957 – present)

Role and operations

United States Air Force 
The host unit at Yokota is the 374th Airlift Wing and is currently used for airlift missions throughout East Asia. The 374th includes four groups: operations, mission support, maintenance and medical. Each group manages a various number of squadrons in order to carry out the wing's mission.

 374th Operations Group (Tail Code: YJ)The 374th Operations Group maintains a forward presence by providing rapid responsive movement of personnel, equipment and operational support in the Asia-Pacific region. The group consists of:
374th Operations Support Squadron
 36th Airlift Squadron (C-130J Super Hercules)
 459th Airlift Squadron (UH-1N Iroquois (Huey), C-12J Huron)

It is not uncommon to see a KC-135 Stratotanker, C-5 Galaxy, KC-10 Extender, C-130, C-17, or civilian charter (Omni Air International, Air Transport International etc. mostly Boeing 757 or 767) and cargo (Atlas Air, Kalitta Air etc. mostly Boeing 747) airline aircraft on military charters on the Transient Aircraft ramp.

 374th Maintenance GroupThe 374th Maintenance Group maintains C-130J, C-12 and UH-1N aircraft supporting intratheater airlift and distinguished visitor transport for Pacific Air Forces.
 374th Mission Support GroupThe 374th Mission Support Group is responsible to the 374th Airlift Wing Commander for the command, control, and direction of support activities to 374 AW and 32 tenant units including Headquarters US Forces Japan and Fifth Air Force.
 374th Medical GroupThe 374th Medical Group ensures medical readiness of 374 AW, 5 AF, and US Forces Japan personnel. They also maintain 64 War Reserve Materiel projects, including the USAF's largest Patient Movement Item inventory.
RQ-4B Global Hawks of Detachment 1, 319th Operations Group deploy to Yokota from Andersen AFB in Guam during the typhoon season, normally between June to December.

AMC passenger terminal
The newly renovated Air Mobility Command (AMC) Passenger Terminal is on the main part of the base next to the flightline. It is a 5 to 7-minute walk from the Kanto Lodge (see below) and offers Space-Available flights to various destinations in PACAF such as Alaska, Guam, Hawaii, Korea, Okinawa, Singapore, as well as the Continental United States.

Based units 
Flying and notable non-flying units based at Yokota Air Base.

Units marked GSU are Geographically Separate Units, which although based at Yokota, are subordinate to a parent unit based at another location.

United States Air Force 
Pacific Air Forces (PACAF)

 Fifth Air Force
 Headquarters Fifth Air Force
 374th Airlift Wing (Host Wing)
 Headquarters 374th Airlift Wing
 374th Operations Group
 36th Airlift Squadron – C-130J Hercules
 374th Operations Support Squadron
 459th Airlift Squadron – UH-1N Iroquois and C-12J Huron
 374th Maintenance Group
 374th Aircraft Maintenance Squadron
 374th Maintenance Operations Squadron
 374th Maintenance Squadron
 374th Medical Group
 374th Aerospace Medicine Squadron
 374th Dental Squadron
 374th Medical Operations Squadron
 374th Medical Support Squadron
 374th Surgical Operations Squadron
 374th Mission Support Group
 374th Civil Engineer Squadron
 374th Communications Squadron
 374th Contracting Squadron
 374th Force Support Squadron
 374th Logistics Readiness Squadron
 374th Security Forces Squadron
USAF Band of the Pacific - Asia

Air Force Special Operations Command (AFSOC)

353rd Special Operations Group
21st Special Operations Squadron (GSU) – CV-22B Osprey
753rd Special Operations Aircraft Maintenance Squadron (GSU)

Air Combat Command (ACC)

 Sixteenth Air Force
 319th Reconnaissance Wing
 319th Operations Group
 4th Reconnaissance Squadron (seasonal) – RQ-4B Global Hawk

Air Mobility Command (AMC)

 United States Air Force Expeditionary Center
 515th Air Mobility Operations Wing
 515th Air Mobility Operations Group (GSU)
 730th Air Mobility Squadron

United States Coast Guard 
Coast Guard Pacific Area (PACAREA)

 Fourteenth District
 US Coast Guard Activities Far East (FEACT)

United States Department of Defense 
United States Indo-Pacific Command (USINDOPACOM)

 United States Forces Japan
 Headquarters United States Forces Japan

Japan Air Self-Defense Force 
Air Defense Command

 Air Defense Command Headquarters
 Air Tactics Development Wing Headquarters
 Air Intelligence Wing
 Operations Support Wing
 Yokota Regional Air Police Squadron
 Yokota Weather Squadron

Lawsuits
Resistance to the air base immediately followed the end of US occupation. Gravel used in the construction of the airfields was taken from the Tama River, lowering the riverbed and affecting the traditional irrigation system (Fuchū-yōsui), which had provided water to local communities since the early Edo period. The base also caused great stress to nearby inhabitants in a number of other ways, such as fuel leaks and spills that contaminated groundwater and well water, foul odors and fires, deafening noise pollution, and repeated plane crashes. Although local leaders succeeded in bringing about the return of land that had been taken for the base in Tachikawa, at Yokota, the number of departures and landings per year reached 20,000. Pilot training that simulated landing jets on aircraft carriers was also held several times each year, often throughout the night. Because such training, together with the engine testing and daily flights, created a level of noise pollution that local inhabitants found unbearable, numerous lawsuits were filed against the Japanese and U.S. governments, calling for a halt in flights and compensation for damages caused by the noise pollution. At present, a small fraction of the compensation demanded for past damages appears likely to be awarded. "Yokota Airbase Pollution Lawsuit No. 9", filed on 12 December 2012 and "New Yokota Airbase Pollution Lawsuit No. 2", filed on 26 March 2013, are currently being disputed.

Base amenities

The 374th Force Support Squadron
The 374th Force Support Squadron is responsible for providing an enhanced quality of life, facilities and programs for 11,000 military, civilian and dependents as well as 150,000 transient personnel per year. The 374th Force Support Squadron provides manpower and personnel support, membership clubs, child development, youth programs, food service, lodging, sports/fitness, recreation/leisure activities, comprehensive readiness program, marketing/publicity, linen exchange, and mortuary operations for Yokota AB.

Friendship Festival

Each year in September, Yokota Air Base opens the gates to the Japanese community for its annual Friendship Festival. For two days, local residents can learn about Yokota Air Base. Food and events are provided for all ages. Roughly 200,000 visitors show up each year, although non-Japanese visitors may be turned away from the gates for security reasons.

For those two days, visitors are able to examine many types of aircraft and tour some of the large cargo planes from inside.

In 2020 and 2021, it was canceled due to the spread of the COVID-19 pandemic. 2022 was held on May 21 and May 22, three months earlier than usual. On the May 22, the 46th President of the United States, Joe Biden, visited Japan with the arrival of related equipment, including the dedicated Air Force One, but the Friendship Festival was held as scheduled.

Education
The Department of Defense Education Activity operates schools at Yokota for children of personnel assigned to the base.

 Joan K. Mendel Elementary School (formerly known as Yokota East Elementary School)
 Yokota West Elementary School
 Yokota Middle School: School Dedication Ceremony took place on 13 June 2000. YMS initial year began with only grades 7 and 8, with the upstairs specialty wing housing High School classes until construction modifications to YHS were completed. Class officially began August 2000.
 Yokota High School: The Home of the Yokota Panthers. The school was constructed in 1973. A new "21st century" school started construction in 2015 and finished in 2017. The new school replaced the old Yokota High School.

Higher educational opportunities for those in the military and working for the Department of Defense, as well as for family members at Yokota are available through several contracted academic institutions. For example:
 The Asian Division of University of Maryland Global Campus (UMGC) (known as the University of Maryland University College until July 1, 2019)

Tama Hills Recreation Area
The Tama Hills Recreation Area comprises about one-half of the 500-acre Tama Services Division Annex, the other half being the Tama Hills Golf Course.

In popular culture
The base was the setting of Almost Transparent Blue, a best-selling novel written by Ryu Murakami and published in 1976, as well as the anime Blood the Last Vampire and the short film Baby Blue from Genius Party, directed by Shinichiro Watanabe. Yokota Air Base and its surrounding area were the central location for the 2006 movie Sugar and Spice and mentioned briefly in Patlabor 2: The Movie. It is also the setting of parts of The Yokota Officers Club : A Novel by Sarah Bird. The base is also the birthplace of US Marine Captain, former UFC fighter and Fox Sports analyst Brian Stann. The base was also briefly featured in the 2016 biopic Snowden as one of Edward Snowden's workplaces.

References

Some of the text in this article was taken from pages on the Yokota Air Base website, which as a work of the U.S. Government is presumed to be a public domain resource. That information was supplemented by:

Bibliography
 Fletcher, Harry R. (1989) Air Force Bases Volume II, Active Air Force Bases outside the United States of America on 17 September 1982. Maxwell AFB, Alabama: Office of Air Force History. 
 Maurer, Maurer (1983). Air Force Combat Units of World War II. Maxwell AFB, Alabama: Office of Air Force History. .
 Ravenstein, Charles A. (1984). Air Force Combat Wings Lineage and Honors Histories 1947–1977. Maxwell AFB, Alabama: Office of Air Force History. .
 Rogers, Brian (2005). United States Air Force Unit Designations Since 1978. Hinkley, England: Midland Publications. .

External links

 Official website
 JASDF Yokota Air Base (in Japanese)
 610th Military Airlift Support Squadron Alumini

Military airbases established in 1940
Installations of the United States Air Force in Japan
Airfields of the United States Army Air Forces Air Transport Command in the Pacific Ocean Theater
Aviation in Tokyo
Transport in the Greater Tokyo Area
Airfields of the United States Army Air Forces in Occupied Japan
Japan Air Self-Defense Force bases
Military facilities in Tokyo
Military installations of Japan